KALA (88.5 FM) is a 10,000 watt public format, non-profit radio station in Davenport, Iowa, one of the Quad Cities.  The station licensee, St. Ambrose University is authorized by the Federal Communications Commission. KALA also has a translator for KALA HD2 at 106.1 FM.

KALA's format includes news, information and entertainment from National Public Radio and from Public Radio Exchange.  The station's jazz and variety musical lineup includes several styles of music. Catering to specialty/niche audiences, this lineup includes: mainstream and fusion jazz, blues, roots, gospel, Latin, classic rock, oldies, indie rock, and alternative music. The station also plays "New World" eclectic international pop music, urban contemporary, and classic R & B. KALA is an affiliate of the syndicated Pink Floyd program "Floydian Slip."

During the week, KALA features public service programming (both syndicated and locally produced); there are also local, state, and national news. The station also features live radio programs, St. Ambrose University campus news, a local calendar of events, daily weather updates, and student-run music shows. A mainstay of the station's commitment to the University community is its live home/remote coverage of St. Ambrose University sports events. This includes SAU's Fighting Bees/Queen Bees basketball, football, and baseball

The KALA webpage has information about the station, and allows periodic webcast of events and programming. It also features live streaming of its air signal, and Associated Press Video network news.

KALA also features an online station by students for students. "The Stinger" plays Top 40 hits, country, alternative, and rock music, along with music and talk shows hosted by student DJs.

References

External links
KALA official website

Radio stations in the Quad Cities
Radio stations established in 1967
St. Ambrose University
ALA
1967 establishments in Iowa